Doukkala is a tribal confederation of mostly Arab origin, and is also a natural region of Morocco made of fertile plains and forests. Nowadays it is part of the Casablanca-Settat administrative region. 

The region is a plain stretching from the Atlantic Ocean south of Sidi Rahal Chatai up to some 50 km further southward and the same distance eastward. The main urban centers are Sidi Smail, Sidi Bennour, Had Ouled Frej , Khemis Zemamra . Sidi Bennour is the fastest developing center of the four. It is mainly an agricultural region, with few tourist attractions.

Etymology 
According to Mohamed Chafik, the name Doukkala is derived from the concatenation of two Berber words Idu means under and kal means surface, corresponding to its flat landscape and also its position compared to the Atlas Mountains in contrast to Jbel Toubkal (highest peak in Morocco).

History 
Originally, Doukkala referred to a confederation of Berber tribes which occupied the territory between the rivers of Oum Er-Rbia River and Tensift and from the Atlantic Ocean to Jbilate near present-day Marrakesh. They were a mix of majority Masmuda: the Ragrâga, Hazmîra, Banû Dghûgh, Banû Mâgir, and Mushtarayya (Mouchtaraia), together with the Sanhaja who occupied the Atlantic coast between Azemmour and south of El Jadida. They were part of the larger tribal confederation of Barghawata that stretched from Anfa to Tensift, an independent state from 744 AD to 1058 AD, however this area was largely depopulated after the Almoravids conquered it in 1058.

When the Almohads under Abd al-Mu'min captured the town of Marrakesh in 1147, the Doukkala sided against them and in favor of the Almoravid dynasty. They were subsequently defeated by Abd al-Mu'min, and purged, with women and children being sold into slavery. Abd al-Mu'min subsequently encouraged the settlement of Bedouin Arab tribes in the area and the rest of the Moroccan coastal plains, including Banu Hilal and Banu Ma'qil, which led to a further extension of Arabic and an increased importance of Arab leadership in Morocco to the point where no one could have ruled there without their co-operation. By 1250, only the Ragrâga was the only Berber tribe that had survived intact after their conquest by the migration of Arab tribes. At the end of the French protectorate (ca 1950), there lived in Doukkala 372,269 Muslims, 2,680 Europeans and 3,933 Jews.

Geography 
Doukkala is divided in three sub-regions, parallel to the seacoast.
 The "Oulja" (Arabic: الولـجة), along the beach, with garden-crops.
 The "Sahel" (Arabic: الساحل), some 20 km inside, a stony region, only suiting to sheep breeding.
 The rich plain, with wheat, sugar beets, and intensive cattle breeding.

The only mountain to be seen is at the border with the plain of Rahamna called "Jbel Lakhdar" (Arabic: الجبل الاخضر) meaning "Green Mountain".

The plain is subject to flooding. A temporary natural lake between Sidi Bennour and Larbaa Ouled Amrane called "Ouarar" (Arabic: ورار) only fills in rainy years. Its largest surface was noted in 1916, 1966 and 2008.

Gallery

References

External links

A Directory of African Wetlands - Page 66 - Google Books

Geography of Morocco
Natural regions of Africa
Arab tribes in Morocco